Eric Mowbray Knight (10 April 1897 – 15 January 1943) was an English novelist and screenwriter, who is mainly known for his 1940 novel Lassie Come-Home, which introduced the fictional collie Lassie.  He took American citizenship in 1942 shortly before his death.

Biography
Born in Menston, West Riding of Yorkshire, Knight was the youngest of three sons born to Marion Hilda (née Creasser) and Frederic Harrison Knight, both Quakers. His father was a rich diamond merchant who, when Eric was two years old, was killed during the Boer War. His mother then moved to St. Petersburg, Imperial Russia, to work as a governess for the imperial family. The family later settled in the United States in 1912.

Knight had a varied career, including service in the Princess Patricia's Canadian Light Infantry during World War I as a signaller then served as a captain of field artillery in the U.S. Army Reserve until 1926. His two brothers were both killed in World War I serving with the Pennsylvania Army National Guard.  He did stints as an art student, newspaper reporter and Hollywood screenwriter.

He married twice, first on 28 July 1917, to Dorothy Caroline Noyes Hall, with whom he had three daughters and later divorced, and secondly to Jere Brylawski on 2 December 1932.

Writing career
Knight's first novel was Invitation to Life (Greenberg, 1934). The second was Song on Your Bugles (1936) about the working class in Northern England.  As "Richard Hallas", he wrote the hardboiled genre novel You Play the Black and the Red Comes Up (1938). Knight's This Above All is considered one of the significant novels of the Second World War. He also helped co-author the film, Battle of Britain in the "Why We Fight" Series under the direction of Frank Capra.

Knight and his second wife Jere Knight raised collies on their farm in Pleasant Valley, Bucks County, Pennsylvania. They resided at Springhouse Farm from 1939 to 1943. His novel Lassie Come-Home was published in 1940, expanded from a short story published in 1938 in The Saturday Evening Post.

One of Knight's last books was Sam Small Flies Again, republished as The Flying Yorkshireman (Pocket Books 493, 1948; 273 pages).  On the back of The Flying Yorkshireman, this blurb appeared:

Works
 Song On Your Bugles (1936)
 You Play The Black and The Red Comes Up (written as: Richard Hallas) (1940)
 Now Pray We for Our Country (1940)
 Sam Small Flies Again (also titled: The Flying Yorkshireman) (1942)
 This Above All (1942)
 Lassie Come-Home (1943)
 Portrait of a Flying Yorkshireman (edited by Paul Rotha) (1952)
 
Source:

Death
In 1943, at which time he was a major in the United States Army – Special Services where he wrote two of Frank Capra's Why We Fight series, Knight was killed in a C-54 air crash in Dutch Guiana (now Suriname) in South America.

References

External links

"Eric Knight Home Page" at the Lassie Family Website
 
Biography at Chelsea-Collies.com

 
 Richard Hallas at LC Authorities, with 4 records, and [https://www.worldcat.org/identities/lccn-no95-049336 at WorldCat
 Eric Knight Papers. Yale Collection of American Literature, Beinecke Rare Book and Manuscript Library.

1897 births
1943 deaths
20th-century American novelists
20th-century English novelists
American children's writers
United States Army personnel of World War I
Canadian Expeditionary Force soldiers
English children's writers
English emigrants to the United States
Lassie
Novelists from Pennsylvania
People from Bucks County, Pennsylvania
People from Menston
Victims of aviation accidents or incidents in 1943
Victims of aviation accidents or incidents in Suriname
United States Army personnel killed in World War II
United States Army reservists
United States Army officers
Military personnel from Yorkshire
Canadian military personnel of World War I
Princess Patricia's Canadian Light Infantry soldiers
British emigrants to the United States